COZ may refer to

 COZ is the ICAO airline designator for Cosmic Air, Nepal
 COZ is the IATA airport code for Constanza Airport, Dominican Republic